Thoothukkudi Lok Sabha constituency is one of the 39 Lok Sabha (parliamentary) constituencies in Tamil Nadu, a state in southern India.

Assembly segments
Thoothukkudi Lok Sabha constituency comprises the following legislative assembly segments:

List of members of parliament

Election results

General Election 2019

General Election 2014

General Election 2009

See also
Lok Sabha
Parliament of India
Thoothukudi district
List of Constituencies of the Lok Sabha

References

External links
Election Commission of India
Thoothukudi Lok Sabha - Result University
Thoothukudi lok sabha  constituency election 2019 date and schedule

Lok Sabha constituencies in Tamil Nadu
Thoothukudi district